__NoTOC__

 was a Japanese author, critic, playwright, translator, editor, educator, and professor at Waseda University. He has been referred to as a seminal figure in Japanese drama.

Biography 
He was born Tsubouchi Yūzō (坪内 雄蔵), in Gifu prefecture.  He also used the pen name Harunoya Oboro (春のや おぼろ).

His book of criticism, Shōsetsu Shinzui (The Essence of the Novel), helped free novels and dramas from the low opinion that the Japanese had of such literature. Tsubouchi's writings on realism in literature influenced Masaoka Shiki's ideas about realism in haiku. Tsubouchi's novel, Tōsei Shosei Katagi (Portraits of Contemporary Students), was one of the earliest modern novels in Japan.

His Kabuki play Kiri Hitoha (A Paulownia Leaf) was influenced by his studies of both the famous Kabuki and Jōruri (puppet theater) dramatist Chikamatsu Monzaemon and William Shakespeare. The play, in turn, influenced modern Kabuki. He also did a complete translation of the plays of Shakespeare, written in the old-fashion language of Kabuki.

His modern play, Shinkyoku Urashima, incorporating traditional dance and music, was a popular and critical success. The play was a retelling of a familiar Japanese folk-tale with a Rip Van Winkle-like protagonist, Urashima Tarō.

Besides Shakespeare, he also translated a number of other works from English into Japanese, including Sir Walter Scott's The Bride of Lammermoor and Bulwer-Lytton's novel Rienzi, the Last of the Roman Tribunes.

Tsubouchi founded and edited the periodical Waseda Bungaku (Waseda Literature), which published from 1891 to 1898. Tsubouchi is also noted for the long running ronsō (literary dispute) that he carried on with Mori Ōgai.

The Waseda University Tsubouchi Memorial Theatre Museum was named in his honour and houses a large collection of his works. A bronze bust of him was also placed there.

Works

Criticism
Shōsetsu Shinzui (The Essence of the Novel) (1885)

Novel
Tōsei Shosei Katagi (Portraits of Contemporary Students) (1885)
Saikun (1889)

Kabuki plays
Kiri Hitoha (A Paulownia Leaf) written 1894-5, and performed in 1904
Maki no Kata (1896)
Hototogisu Kojō no Rakugetsu (The Sinking Moon over the Lonely Castle Where the Cuckoo Cries) (1897)

Modern dramas
Shinkyoku Urashima (The New Urashima) (1904)
En no Gyōja (En the Ascetic) (1916)

See also

Futabatei Shimei
Japanese literature
Hagiwara Hiromichi—works

References

External links 

Tsubouchi, Shoyo at National Diet Library, Japan
 e-texts of Shoyo's works at Aozora Bunko

People from Gifu Prefecture
1859 births
1935 deaths
Japanese writers
Translators of William Shakespeare
Writers from Gifu Prefecture